Jul i Tøyengata is a Norwegian televised advent calendar created by the Norwegian comedian Zahid Ali. The show is a parody on another Norwegian advent calendar Jul i Skomakergata from 1979, and is set in Tøyen, Oslo.

The series received a "die throw" of 4 in Verdens Gang, 3 in Dagbladet and another mediocre review in Dagens Næringsliv.

Cast
Zahid Ali - Shoemaker Ali, Konnerud
Nikis Theophilakis - Naeem
Morten Rudå - Varberg
Siw Anita Andersen - Iram
Bodil Lahelle - Ms. Konnerud
Robert Gustafsson - Radko
Øystein Martinsen - Abel Seidelbaum
The three Africans: Buntu Pupa, Banthata Mukguatsane and Jimu Makurumbandi

References

TVNorge original programming
Norwegian comedy television series
Christmas television series
Television shows set in Oslo
2006 Norwegian television series debuts
2006 Norwegian television series endings
2000s Norwegian television series